Eugene Crean (1854–1939) was an Irish nationalist politician and MP in the House of Commons of the United Kingdom of Great Britain and Ireland and member of the Irish Parliamentary Party 1892–1910, for the All-for Ireland Party 1910–1918.

He was born at No. 3 Douglas Street, Cork (the house is still standing), a son of Daniel Crean. He had two brothers (Patrick and Daniel) and three sisters (Honora, Margaret and Anne). Married to Hannah FitzGerald, they had six children: Daniel, Nell, Norah. May, Kay and Thomas.

A carpenter by trade, he was involved in the trade union movement in Cork city and as a representative of the Carpenters’ Society, was elected president of the Cork United Trades Workers Association. He was elected in 1886 to the Cork City Council, and was President of the Cork Trade Council in 1886 until deposed in 1890 for his opposition to Parnell in the split. He was President of the Cork County Board 1890-91.

In the 1892 general election he was chosen on the recommendation of Michael Davitt, who continued to advocate for a place for labour within the nationalist movement, as candidate for the anti-Parnellite Irish National Federation and was elected "Labour Nationalist" MP for Queen's County (Ossory Division). He retained his seat 1895–1900. Then at the suggestion of Davitt sat for south-east Cork from 1900 as a member of the re-united Irish Parliamentary Party, after defeating the Healyite candidate, and was again returned in 1906. He was the last bearer of the title "Mayor of Cork" when elected in 1899, which was changed to Lord Mayor of Cork in 1900.

One of William O'Brien's closest allies, he joined with him from 1910 and was elected as an All-for-Ireland Party (AFIL) MP in both elections that year,  retaining his seat until the December 1918 election when he stood down together with the other members of the AFIL party. During the previous June, when Arthur Griffith asked O’Brien to have the writ moved for his candidacy in the Cavan-east by-election, O'Brien sent two AFIL MPs to Westminster where Crean moved the writ. Griffith was subsequently elected with a sizable majority.

Crean was a patron of the Gaelic Athletic Association in its early years and although a Member of Parliament for 26 years, he died in relative obscurity at his Douglas Street, Cork residence on 12 January 1939.

Notes

Sources
 Stenton, Michael and Lees, Stephen, Who's Who in British Members of Parliament 1886–1918
 Maume, Patrick, The long Gestation, Irish Nationalist Life 1891–1918, "Who's Who" p. 225, Gill & Macmillan  (1999) 
 Cadogen, Tim & Falvey, Jeremiah, A Biographical Dictionary of Cork Four Courts Press (2006),

External links 
 

1854 births
1939 deaths
UK MPs 1892–1895
UK MPs 1895–1900
UK MPs 1900–1906
UK MPs 1906–1910
UK MPs 1910
UK MPs 1910–1918
Anti-Parnellite MPs
Irish Parliamentary Party MPs
All-for-Ireland League MPs
People from Cork (city)
Members of the Parliament of the United Kingdom for Queen's County constituencies (1801–1922)
Politicians from County Cork
Members of the Parliament of the United Kingdom for County Cork constituencies (1801–1922)